625 most commonly refers to:
 625 (number)
 AD 625, a year
 625 BC, a year

625 may also refer to:

Arts, entertainment, and media
 625 Thrashcore, an American record label
 Minuscule 625, a Greek manuscript of the New Testament
 Theatre 625, a British television drama anthology series

Astronomy
 625 Xenia, a minor planet orbiting the Sun
 Gliese 625, a red dwarf star located in the constellation Draco
 NGC 625, a dwarf barred spiral galaxy in the constellation Phoenix

Military
 No. 625 Squadron RAF, a heavy bomber squadron of the Royal Air Force during World War II
 No. 625 Volunteer Gliding Squadron RAF, a flying training unit of Royal Air Force

Transportation
 List of highways numbered 625

Aircraft
 American Airlines Flight 625, a Boeing 727-100 that crashed at St. Thomas, U.S. Virgin Islands on April 27, 1976

Automobiles
 Ferrari Tipo 625, a four-cylinder engine, used in the following cars:
 Ferrari 625 F1, a 1954 Italian F1 racing car
 Ferrari 625 LM, a 1956 Italian sports racer
 Ferrari 625 TF, a 1953 Italian sports racer

Rail
 FS Class 625, a class of 2-6-0 'mogul' steam locomotives in Italy

Watercraft
 Beituo 625-class tug, a class of naval auxiliary ship of the People's Liberation Army Navy
 German submarine U-625, a Type VIIC U-boat of Nazi Germany's Kriegsmarine during World War II
 Type 625 research vessel, a series of oceanographic research ship of the People's Liberation Army Navy
 USS Harding (DD-625), a Gleaves-class destroyer of the United States Navy

Other uses
 625 Park Avenue, a co-op residential building in New York City, New York, United States
 Experiment 625, the codename for Reuben, a fictional alien character from Disney's Lilo & Stitch franchise
 Nokia Lumia 625, a Windows Phone
 Smith & Wesson Model 625, a six-round, double-action revolver